"Touch Me When We're Dancing" is a song written by Terry Skinner, J. L. Wallace and Ken Bell. Skinner and Wallace headed the Muscle Shoals, Alabama session group Bama, who first recorded this song and released it as a single in 1979 reaching number 42 on the Billboard Easy Listening chart and number 86 on the Billboard Hot 100 chart. The song was later recorded by The Carpenters in 1981 for their Made in America album. In 1984, it was recorded by country music artists Mickey Gilley and Charly McClain for their 1984 duet album It Takes Believers and in 1986 by the country music group Alabama.

Bama version
The version by Bama was produced by Jim Vienneau and released on the Free Flight label. It received a positive review in Billboard which praised the "smooth production" and said that the song "allows the group to achieve a strong identity".

Carpenters' version

The Carpenters' version of "Touch Me When We're Dancing" was released on their Made in America album in the summer of 1981. Placing at number 16 on the Billboard Hot 100, it was the last of their singles to reach the Top 40 after not having a song appear on that chart for over three years. It was also their fifteenth (and final) number-one song on the adult contemporary chart. The B-side, "Because We Are in Love", was played at Karen Carpenter's wedding to Thomas Burris on August 31, 1980.

Music video
The video for "Touch Me When Were Dancing" can be found on The Carpenters video collection Gold. The video consists of Karen Carpenter singing and slowly dancing by her brother Richard Carpenter's piano. Footage of a couple dancing is superimposed onto Richard's black piano, as is a view from behind Richard of his hands as he plays. In the background are the guitar player and the drummer.

Charts

Weekly charts

Year-end charts

Credits and personnel
Karen Carpenter – lead and backing vocals
Richard Carpenter – backing vocals, Fender Rhodes electric piano, piano, orchestration
Joe Osborn – bass
Tony Peluso – acoustic and electric guitars
Tim May – acoustic & electric guitars
Larrie Londin – drums
Paulinho da Costa - wind chimes, cabasa, shaker, tambourine, cowbell
Tom Scott – tenor saxophone
Earl Dumler - oboe
Carolyn Dennis – backing vocals

Alabama version

The Alabama version was released in September 1986 as the first single from the album The Touch. It went on to become a number one hit on Billboards Hot Country Songs chart later that year, their 20th straight chart-topper in a string that dated back to 1980.

Music video
A music video was made for the song, and was directed by Marc Ball.

Chart positions

References

1979 singles
1981 singles
1986 singles
1979 songs
The Carpenters songs
Mickey Gilley songs
Charly McClain songs
Alabama (American band) songs
A&M Records singles
RCA Records singles
Song recordings produced by Harold Shedd
Songs written by Terry Skinner
Songs written by Ken Bell (songwriter)
Songs written by J. L. Wallace
Songs about dancing